Óscar Montiel Marín (born 6 July 1970) is a Spanish retired footballer who played as a defender. His son, Tòfol, is also a professional footballer.

References

External links

1970 births
Living people
Footballers from Palma de Mallorca
Spanish footballers
Association football defenders
La Liga players
Segunda División players
Segunda División B players
RCD Mallorca players
CF Extremadura footballers
Albacete Balompié players